vz 52 or vz. 52 may refer to:
 vz. 52, or CZ 52, Czech semi-automatic pistol
 vz. 52 rifle, Czech self-loading rifle
 Vz. 52 machine gun, Czech light machine gun